Heat Vision and Jack is a 1999 American comedy science fiction television pilot created and written by Rob Schrab and Dan Harmon, directed by Ben Stiller, and starring Jack Black, Owen Wilson, and Ron Silver. The pilot was originally ordered by Fox, which ultimately did not order it to series. While the show was not picked up, the pilot became a cult classic and gained an online following.

Plot

The pilot opens with Ben Stiller talking about the cancelled Ben Stiller Show, the Emmy Award he won for the show, and sarcastically criticizing George Lucas for having not won an Emmy. After a short sting, Heat Vision then opens with a title sequence explaining how Jack gained his new powers, and how Heat Vision came into existence.

Cast and characters

Main
 Jack Black as Jack Austin, a former astronaut. He was exposed to inappropriate levels of solar energy, giving him superintelligence. He appears to lose this intelligence at night, requiring only Earth-normal levels of daylight to reactivate it. His catchphrases are "I know EVERYTHING!" and "Knowledge is power... for real."
 Owen Wilson as Heat Vision, a talking motorcycle. He was created when Jack's unemployed roommate Doug was shot by an experimental ray gun, causing him to merge with his motorcycle. He is capable of speech and can fight by ramming into opponents. He is unable to use doorknobs and is unable to right himself if pushed over.
 Ron Silver as himself, the main villain. He works for NASA, and will stop at nothing to capture or kill Jack Austin, but he also dabbles in acting, perhaps as a diversion, perhaps as a cover. He appears to be invulnerable, shrugging off the threat of being shot and later displaying great annoyance but no injury or pain when he is actually shot.

Guest
 Christine Taylor as The Sheriff
 Vincent Schiavelli as Frank, a cook who becomes possessed by an alien broadcast and thereafter calls himself Paragon
 O-Lan Jones as Patrice
 Sy Richardson as Doctor

Legacy
Heat Vision was featured as a part of the mockumentary Tropic Thunder: Rain of Madness, only stating that the character of "Jeff Portnoy" played the role of Jack Austin.

In a March 27, 2007 interview, Rob Schrab stated that a script for the Heat Vision and Jack feature film was in the works.

References

External links

 Heat Vision and Jack - Behind the Scenes

Fiction about the Sun
Television pilots not picked up as a series
Television series by 20th Century Fox Television
Unaired television pilots
Television series created by Dan Harmon
Works about astronauts
Television series by Red Hour Productions